Acherontiella is a genus of springtails in the family Hypogastruridae. There are at least 20 described species in Acherontiella.

Species
These 20 species belong to the genus Acherontiella:

 Acherontiella aokii Tamura & Yue, 1999 i c g
 Acherontiella bougisi Cassagnau & Delamare Deboutteville, 1955 i c g
 Acherontiella candida (Delamare Deboutteville, 1952) i c g
 Acherontiella carusoi Dallai, 1978 i c g
 Acherontiella cassagnaui Thibaud, 1967 i c g
 Acherontiella cavernicola (Tarsia in Curia, 1941) i c g
 Acherontiella colotlipana Palacios-Vargas & Thibaud, 1985 i c g
 Acherontiella dentata Djanaschvili, 1971 i c g
 Acherontiella epigea Bonet, 1945 i c g
 Acherontiella globulata Thibaud & Massoud, 1980 i c g
 Acherontiella kowalskiorum Weiner & Najt, 1998 i c g
 Acherontiella mac (Palacios-Vargas & Thibaud, 1985) i c g
 Acherontiella massoudi Thibaud, 1963 i c g
 Acherontiella onychiuriformis Absolon, 1913 i c g
 Acherontiella prominentia Thibaud & Weiner in Najt, & Matile, 1997 i c g
 Acherontiella sabina Bonet, 1945 i c g
 Acherontiella thai Thibaud, 1990 i c g
 Acherontiella thibaudi Barra, 1994 i c g
 Acherontiella variabilis Delamare Deboutteville, 1948 i c g
 Acherontiella xenylliformis Gisin, 1952 i c g

Data sources: i = ITIS, c = Catalogue of Life, g = GBIF, b = Bugguide.net

References

Further reading

 
 
 

Collembola
Springtail genera
Taxa named by Karel Absolon